Nothotsuga is a genus of coniferous trees in the family Pinaceae endemic to China. Nothotsuga contains only one species, Nothotsuga longibracteata, commonly known as the bristlecone hemlock, which is found in southeastern China, in southern Fujian, northern Guangdong, northeast Guangxi, northeast Guizhou, and southwest Hunan.

Description

Taxonomy
In many respects, Nothotsuga is intermediate between the genera Keteleeria and Tsuga. It was discovered in 1932, and at first treated as Tsuga longibracteata, being classified in its own genus in 1989 when new research indicated how distinct it is from other species of Tsuga - by the larger, erect cones with exserted bracts, and (like Keteleeria) male cones in umbels, and from Keteleeria by the shorter leaves and smaller cones.

Conservation
It is a very rare tree listed as a near-threatened species by the International Union for Conservation of Nature due to historical deforestation, though it is now protected.

References

Further reading

External links
 Arboretum de Villardebelle - photo of cones
 Gymnosperm Database
 Flora of China

Pinaceae
Endemic flora of China
Trees of China
Flora of Fujian
Flora of Guangdong
Flora of Guangxi
Flora of Guizhou
Flora of Hunan
Monotypic conifer genera
Near threatened flora of Asia